The following is an alphabetical list of topics related to the French overseas collectivity of Saint Barthélemy.

0–9 

.bl – Internet country code top-level domain for Saint-Barthélemy

A
Americas
North America
North Atlantic Ocean
West Indies
Mer des Caraïbes (Caribbean Sea)
Antilles
Petites Antilles (Lesser Antilles)
Islands of Saint Barthélemy
Antilles
Atlas of Saint-Barthélemy

B

C
Capital of Saint Barthélemy:  Gustavia
Caribbean
Caribbean Sea
Categories:
:Category:Saint Barthélemy
:Category:Buildings and structures in Saint Barthélemy
:Category:Communications in Saint Barthélemy
:Category:Economy of Saint Barthélemy
:Category:Geography of Saint Barthélemy

:Category:History of Saint Barthélemy
:Category:Politics of Saint Barthélemy
:Category:Saint Barthélemy culture
:Category:Saint Barthélemy-related lists
:Category:Society of Saint Barthélemy
:Category:Transport in Saint Barthélemy
commons:Category:Saint Barthélemy
Coat of arms of Saint Barthélemy
Collectivité de Saint-Barthélemy (French overseas collectivity of Saint Barthélemy)
Communications in Saint Barthélemy

D
Demographics of Saint Barthélemy

E
Economy of Saint Barthélemy
Eugenie Blanchard
European colonization of the Americas

F

Flag of France
Flag of Saint Barthélemy
France
French America
French colonization of the Americas
French language
French overseas collectivity of Saint Barthélemy (Collectivité de Saint-Barthélemy)
French Republic (République française)
 French West Indies

G
Geography of Saint Barthélemy
Gustavia – Capital of Saint Barthélemy

H
History of Saint Barthélemy

I
Île Saint-Barthélemy
International Organization for Standardization (ISO)
ISO 3166-1 alpha-2 country code for Saint-Barthélemy: BL
ISO 3166-1 alpha-3 country code for Saint-Barthélemy: BLM
Islands of Saint Barthélemy:
Saint Barthélemy
Île Boulanger
Île Chevreau
Île Coco
Île du Pain de sucre
Île Fourche
Île Frégate
Île Mancel
Île Pelé
Île Toc Vers
Îles des Grenadins
Roche le Boeuf
Roche Plate

L
Lists related to Saint Barthélemy:
List of airports in Saint Barthélemy
List of islands of Saint Barthélemy
List of political parties in Saint Barthélemy
List of Saint Barthélemy-related topics

P
Politics of Saint Barthélemy
Possessions of Sweden

R
République française (French Republic)

S
Saint-Barthélemy (Saint Barthélemy, Saint Barts)
Scouting in Saint Barthélemy
Swedish colonization of the Americas
Swedish slave trade

T
Topic outline of Saint Barthélemy
Transport in Saint Barthélemy

W

Wikipedia:WikiProject Topic outline/Drafts/Topic outline of Saint Barthélemy

See also

List of Caribbean-related topics
List of international rankings
Lists of country-related topics
Topic outline of geography
Topic outline of North America
Topic outline of Saint Barthélemy

References

External links

 
Saint Barthelemy